Baptista is a Portuguese term meaning Baptist. It may refer to:

 Baptista (surname) Portuguese surname meaning "Baptist"
Baptista Lake titi, a species of monkey found in Brazil
Joao Baptista de Ajuda, a city of Benin
Estádio Lourival Baptista, a stadium in Aracaju, Brazil

See also

 
 
 Baptiste (disambiguation)
 Battista (Italian surname) Italian term meaning "Baptist"
 Bautista (Spanish surname) Spanish term meaning "Baptist"
 Batista (Portuguese/Spanish surname)